The Harivamsa (literally "the genealogy of Hari") is an important work of Sanskrit literature, containing 16,374 shlokas, mostly in the anustubh metre. The text is also known as the Harivamsa Purana. This text is believed to be a khila (appendix or supplement) to the Mahabharata and is traditionally ascribed to Vyasa. The most celebrated commentary of the Mahabharata by Neelakantha Chaturdhara, the Bharata Bhava Deepa also covers the Harivamsa. According to a traditional version of the Mahabharata, the Harivamsa is divided into two parvas (books) and 12,000 verses. These are included with the eighteen parvas of the Mahabharata. The Critical Edition has three parvas and 5,965 verses.

The Adi Parva of describes the creation of the cosmos and the legendary history of the kings of the Solar and Lunar dynasties leading up to the birth of Krishna. Vishnu Parva recounts the history of Krishna up to the events prior to the Mahabharata. Bhavishya Parva, the third book, includes two alternate creation theories, hymns to Shiva and Vishnu and provides a description of the Kali Yuga. While the Harivamsa has been regarded as an important source of information on the origin of Vishnu's incarnation Krishna, there has been speculation as to whether this text was derived from an earlier text and what its relationship is to the Brahma Purana, another text that deals with the origins of Krishna.

Chronology

The bulk of the text is derived from two traditions, the  tradition, that is, the five marks of the Purana corpus one of which is the  genealogy, and stories about the life of Krishna as a herdsman.

The text is complex, containing layers that go back to the 1st or 2nd centuries BCE. The origin of this appendix is not precisely known but it is apparent that it was a part of the Mahabharata by the 1st century CE because "the poet Ashvaghosha quotes a couple of verses, attributing them to the Mahabharata, which are now only found in the Harivamsa" (Datta 1858).

Edward Washburn Hopkins considers the Harivamsa the latest parva of the Mahabharata. Hazra has dated the Purana to the 4th century CE on the basis of the description of the rasa lila in it. According to him, the Visnu Purana and the Bhagavata Purana belong to the 5th century CE and 6th century CE respectively. According to Dikshit, the date of the Matsya Purana is 3rd century CE.

The verses quoted by Asvaghosa belong to this parva.

Editions

The  is available in three editions. The traditional edition contains 12000 shlokas (verses) 2 sub-parvas, the Harivamsa Parva (187 chapters) and the Bhavishya Parva (48 chapters) with a total of 235 chapters. The Critical Edition or CE (1969–71, Ed. P.L.Vaidya) is around a third (118 chapters in 6073 slokas) of this vulgate edition. Vaidya suggests that even the CE represents an expanded text and proposes that the oldest form of  probably began with chapter 20 (which is where Agni Purana 12 places its start) and must have ended with chapter 98 of his text.

Translations

The Harivamsa has been translated in many Indian vernacular languages; The vulgate version containing 3 books and 271 chapters has not been translated into English yet. The only English translation of the traditional version (2 sub-parvas (Harivamsa parva - 187 chapters and Bhavishya parva - 48 chapters, a total of 235 chapters) is by Manmatha Nath Dutt in 1897 and it is in the public domain. The critical edition has been translated into English twice so far. once in 2016 by Bibek Debroy and by Simon Brodbeck in 2019); French (M. A. Langlois, 1834–35); and other languages.

See also
First book of Mahabharata: Adi Parva
Previous book of Mahabharata: Svargarohana Parva

Notes

References
 Bowker, John, The Oxford Dictionary of World Religions, New York, Oxford University Press, 1997, p. 410
 Winternitz, Maurice (1981) History of Indian Literature Vol. I. Delhi: Motilal Banarsidass.
 Ruben, Walter (1941) "The Krsnacarita in the Harivamsa and Certain Puranas.”  Journal of the American Oriental Society. Vol. 61, No.3. pp. 115–127.
 Lorenz, Ekkehard (2007) The Harivamsa: The Dynasty of Krishna, in Edwin F. Bryant (ed.), Krishna, A Source Book,  Oxford University Press.
 Shastri, Rajendra Muni, Jaina Sahitya mein Sri Krishna Charita, Jaipur, Prakrit Bharati Akademi, 1991.

External links

Original Sanskrit text online with English translation
Manmatha Nath Dutt, Vishnu Purana, English Translation of Book 2 of Harivamsa (1896)
Alexandre Langlois, Harivansa: ou histoire de la famille de Hari, French Translation of Harivamsa (1834)
Discourse on Harvamsha by Dr Vyasanakere Prabhanjanacharya

Hindu texts
Krishna
Mahabharata
Sanskrit texts